The 2003 FIFA Confederations Cup Final was a football match to determine the winners of the 2003 FIFA Confederations Cup. The match was held at Stade de France, Saint-Denis, France, on 29 June 2003 and was contested by Cameroon and France. France won the match 1–0, with a golden goal in the 97th minute from Thierry Henry when he kneed the ball past Carlos Kameni into the left corner of the net from the right of the six yard box after a pass from Lilian Thuram.

Cameroon wore shirts embroidered with Marc-Vivien Foé's name and dates of birth and death as a tribute to their midfielder who had suffered cardiac arrest and died on the pitch during their semi-final game against Colombia three days earlier. At the trophy presentation, two Cameroon players held a large photo of Foé, on which FIFA officials hung a runner-up medal. When France captain Marcel Desailly was presented with the trophy, he held it in unison with Cameroon captain Rigobert Song.

Route to the final

Match details

References

External links 
 Match report

Final
2003
2003
France national football team matches
Confederations Cup Final
Confederations Cup Final
International association football competitions hosted by Paris
Sport in Saint-Denis, Seine-Saint-Denis
FIFA Confederations Cup Final
Cameroon–France relations